The Wine and Vine Museum is a new museum housed in the traditional building belonging to Ioannis Boutaris in the centre of Naoussa in Central Macedonia, Greece. The museum’s mission is primarily educational, in other words to make known the history of wine and wine-making in Naoussa and the surrounding district. All exhibits were donated by the wine-makers and inhabitants of the region.

On display in the museum is the Boutari family’s old wine fermentation vat, wine barrels, demijohns, raki vats, baskets (panniers) for the grape harvest, and other agricultural tools for vine growers. Furthermore, the vineyards and wines of Naoussa are presented through the programme entitled ‘The Roads of Wine’ and there are samples of wines made by all the wine-makers.

For young visitors there is an educational game on the subject of wine-making.

See also

 List of food and beverage museums

References

Sources
 

Museums in Central Macedonia
Wine museums